Bible Christian Mission was a Protestant Christian missionary society that sent workers to countries such as China during the late Qing Dynasty.

See also
Protestant missionary societies in China during the 19th century
Timeline of Chinese history
19th-century Protestant missions in China
List of Protestant missionaries in China
Christianity in China
Samuel Pollard

Christian missionary societies
Christian missions in China